A Spahn tax is a type of currency transaction tax that is meant to be used for the purpose of controlling exchange-rate volatility. This idea was proposed by Paul Bernd Spahn in 1995.

Early history

The initial idea for a currency transaction tax is attributed to James Tobin in 1972, a concept now known as a Tobin tax. On June 16, 1995. Spahn, in his analysis of the original idea, concluded that the concept was not viable and suggested an alternative solution to the problem of managing exchange-rate volatility.

Concept

According to Spahn, "Analysis has shown that the Tobin tax as originally proposed is not viable and should be laid aside for good." Furthermore, he believes that "it is virtually impossible to distinguish between normal liquidity trading and speculative 'noise' trading. If the tax is generally applied at high rates, it will severely impair financial operations and create international liquidity problems, especially if derivatives are taxed as well. A lower tax rate would reduce the negative impact on financial markets, but not mitigate speculation where expectations of an exchange rate change exceed the tax margin."

In 1995, Spahn suggested an alternative, involving "a two-tier rate structure consisting of a low-rate financial transactions tax, plus an exchange surcharge at prohibitive rates as a piggyback. The latter would be dormant in times of normal financial activities, and be activated only in the case of speculative attacks. The mechanism allowing the identification of abnormal trading in world financial markets would make reference to a 'crawling peg' with an appropriate exchange rate band. The exchange rate would move freely within this band without transactions being taxed. Only transactions effected at exchange rates outside the permissible range would become subject to tax. This would automatically induce stabilizing behavior on the part of market participants."

Proposals

On June 15, 2004, the Belgian Parliament approved a bill implementing a Spahn tax. According to the legislation, Belgium will introduce the Spahn tax once all countries of the eurozone introduce a similar law.

In November 2004, Belgium submitted this law for an opinion to the European Central Bank, which provided both an economic and legal assessment. Its summary stated:

"...the ECB concludes that the economic and monetary usefulness of a tax, such as envisaged by the draft law, is highly questionable, given the uncertainty of its claimed benefits and the likely welfare costs arising from distortions in the working of financial markets. This assessment is reinforced by the difficulties expected with respect to its implementation."

It continued:

"...the ECB is of the opinion that the introduction by a euro area Member State of a tax, such as envisaged by the draft law, is incompatible with the Treaty."

See also

 Bank for International Settlements
 Central banks - which issue currency
 Credit crunch
 Currencies
 Currency crisis
 Currency transaction tax
 Exorbitant privilege
 Financial markets
 Financial transaction tax
 Fluctuation in exchange rates
 Foreign exchange controls
 Foreign exchange derivative
 Foreign exchange market
 Liquidity crisis
 Money market
 Noise (economic)
 Paul Bernd Spahn
 Speculation
 Speculative attack
 Speculation in foreign exchange markets
 Spot market
 Sudden stop (economics)
 Tobin tax
 Transfer tax
 Volatility (finance)
 Volatility risk
 Consequences of currency volatility

Related economic crises

 1994 economic crisis in Mexico
 1997 Asian Financial Crisis
 1998 Russian financial crisis
 Argentine economic crisis (1999–2002)
 Financial crisis of 2007–2010

References

External links
 Currency Transaction Taxes - Library of links to legislation, proposals, reports, articles and archives - from Global Policy Forum

Foreign exchange market
Financial transaction tax
International taxation